The name Aere has been used to name four tropical cyclones in the northwestern Pacific Ocean. The name was contributed by the United States of America, and is the Marshallese word for 'storm'.

 Typhoon Aere (2004) (T0417, 20W, Marce), category 2 typhoon that brought severe damage to Taiwan and Eastern China.
 Tropical Storm Aere (2011) (T1101, 03W, Bebeng), struck the Philippines.
 Tropical Storm Aere (2016) (T1619, 22W, Julian), struck Central Vietnam as a tropical depression.
 Tropical Storm Aere (2022) (T2204, 05W, Domeng), struck Japan as a tropical depression.

Pacific typhoon set index articles